Augustus Allen Bird (April 1, 1802February 25, 1870) was an American pioneer and politician. He was the 2nd Mayor of Madison, Wisconsin, represented the Madison area for two terms in the Wisconsin State Assembly, and was one of the commissioners responsible for establishing the first Capitol building located at Madison, Wisconsin, used by the territorial government and Wisconsin Legislature until 1863.

Biography
Born in Thetford, Vermont, he moved with his family to Madison County, New York, and, in 1824, married Charity LeClair. In 1826, he moved with his family to Ann Arbor, Michigan Territory, but returned to Madison County in 1830.

In 1836, Bird moved to the Wisconsin Territory, settled in Milwaukee, and engaged in a construction business. The Governor of Wisconsin Territory Henry Dodge appointed Bird to a three-man commission to plan the new territorial capitol, and, in June 1837, Bird set out with about forty workmen from Milwaukee to the site of the new capitol in Madison, cutting a road from Milwaukee to Madison in the process.

In 1851 and 1856, Bird served in the Wisconsin State Assembly and, in 1857, was elected the 2nd Mayor of Madison. He died suddenly in Green Bay, Wisconsin, while visiting his daughter Marian and her husband, John Starkweather.

His brother, Ira W. Bird, also served in the Wisconsin State Assembly.

References

1802 births
1870 deaths
People from Thetford, Vermont
Wisconsin Territory officials
Mayors of Madison, Wisconsin
Members of the Wisconsin State Assembly
19th-century American politicians